The BLH RS-12 railroad locomotive was a  diesel-electric road-switcher configured with an AAR type B-B wheel arrangement. It was the follow-on model to the former Baldwin DRS-4-4-1000, first introduced in 1948. It was more successful than its predecessor selling 50 units to eight railroads, versus 22 units to three railroads. Only one railroad, The Pennsylvania Railroad bought both models.

When Baldwin Locomotive Works merged with Lima-Hamilton Corporation, forming the Baldwin-Lima-Hamilton Corporation and decided to concentrate locomotive production at Baldwin's Eddystone, Pennsylvania plant. There was still one outstanding order for Lima A-3174s but the customer, New York Central Railroad agreed to receive RS-12s instead.

The locomotive could be ordered with either a steam generator for steam heat, or dynamic brakes contained within the short hood. McCloud River Railroad No. 32 and 33 were the only two ordered with dynamic brakes of the fifty units built. One RS-12 is preserved in operational condition in the "Skunk Train" livery of California Western 56 (Locomotive) at Travel Town Museum in Griffith Park; another #300 is owned by and occasionally used on the Escanaba and Lake Superior Railroad, with others owned by the same railroad held in non-operational condition.

Escanaba and Lake Superior 207 was leased to the Nicolet Badger Northern Railroad for a short time in the 1990s and was later returned to the Escanaba and Lake Superior where it now remains in storage in Wells, Michigan. 

Escanaba and Lake Superior 209 was used for ballast and general freight until the late 1980s when it was put in storage.

Escanaba and Lake Superior 212 started to be rebuilt in the 1980s but the rebuilt was never completed. It remains in storage along with other E&LS Baldwins at Wells, Michigan.

Original buyers

References

 
 
 
 

RS-12
B-B locomotives
Railway locomotives introduced in 1951
Diesel-electric locomotives of the United States
Standard gauge locomotives of the United States